Jagannath Bhattacharya is an Indian doctor and Orthopaedics specialist. He is also a politician. He joined the All India Forward Bloc.

Education
Jagannath Bhattacharya had his primary education in Santragachi Kedarnath Institution, Howrah. Then he gained MBBS from Calcutta University in 1977 and MS (Ortho) degree from University College of Medicine (CU) in 1984.

Political life
Jagannath Bhattacharya was an elected member of the Legislative Assembly in Shibpur of the state of West Bengal in India, under the political party of AIFB. He was active from 2006 to 2011.

References

Living people
West Bengal politicians
University of Calcutta alumni
All India Forward Bloc politicians
1954 births